The Brazilian Union for Interlingua (Portuguese: União Brasileira pró Interlíngua, UBI) is the national Interlingua organization in Brazil. The UBI, founded at the first Brazilian Interlingua Conference in 1990, teaches and promotes Interlingua in South American countries. The UBI arranges annual conferences in Brazil and maintains representation in some Brazilian states.

Internovas, the official bulletin of UBI, was also founded in 1990. Originally printed, it is currently sent by e-mail every three months to UBI members. Internovas, written in Portuguese and Interlingua, presents news, culture, and literature, along with articles on South America and Interlingua activities there. The UBI offers a catalog of its own publications, among them Interlingua-Portuguese and Portuguese-Interlingua dictionaries, elementary and advanced Interlingua courses, and a history of Interlingua.

References

 Union Brazilian pro Interlingua
 Historia de Interlingua: Communication Sin frontieras. Portrait del Organizations de Interlingua
 "Libros", a regular column in Panorama in Interlingua, 2006, Issue 3.

Interlingua organizations
Non-profit organisations based in Brazil